Félix Lasso (28 May 1945 – 13 February 2016) was an Ecuadorian footballer who played for clubs of Ecuador and in Universidad de Chile in Chile.

Teams
  Barcelona 1962–1967
  Universidad de Chile 1968
  Barcelona 1969
  Emelec 1970–1974
  El Nacional 1975–1976
  LDU de Portoviejo 1977–1978
  Barcelona 1979

References

External links
 

1945 births
2016 deaths
Sportspeople from Guayaquil
Ecuadorian footballers
Ecuador international footballers
1975 Copa América players
Barcelona S.C. footballers
Universidad de Chile footballers
C.S. Emelec footballers
C.D. El Nacional footballers
L.D.U. Portoviejo footballers
Ecuadorian expatriate footballers
Expatriate footballers in Chile
Association football midfielders